Football in Åland is governed by the Åland Football Association (ÅFF), which was founded in 1943. ÅFF is a member of Football Association of Finland.

Åland has 11 football clubs that compete at different levels and age groups. Åland even has its own national teams, Åland official football team and Åland official women's football team, despite not being a fully sovereign state or having membership to UEFA or FIFA. Åland women's team won the 2011 Island Games women's football tournament on the Isle of Wight.

Football clubs of Åland play in leagues and competitions of Finland and Sweden. IFK Mariehamn plays currently in the Finnish men's premier league Veikkausliiga while Åland United plays in the Finnish women's top division Kansallainen Liiga.

Men's football clubs

Finnish football league system 
 IFK Mariehamn - Veikkausliiga (Tier 1)
 FC Åland - Kolmonen, SPL Turku district (Tier 4)
 Jomala IK – Vitonen, SPL Turku district (Tier 6)

Swedish football league system 
 Hammarlands IK - Division 7, Uppland östra (Tier 9)

Women's football clubs

Finnish football league system 
 Åland United – Kansallinen Liiga (Tier 1)
 IFK Mariehamn - Naisten Kolmonen, SPL Turku district (Tier 4)

Swedish football league system 
 Jomala IK/IFK Mariehamn/Åland United – Division 5, Uppland östra (Tier 7)

Ålandscupen 
The Ålandscupen was an annual cup competition administered by the ÅFF that was first introduced in 1943.

Youth football
The Åland FA organises a mini-league called ‘Poolspel’ for players of all genders from 6 – 12 years old.

Notable players from Åland 
Anders Eriksson
Jani Lyyski
Annica Sjölund
Daniel Sjölund
Tommy Wirtanen
Joel Mattsson

External links 
Åland Football Association Official Homepage

Football in Åland